The Wakatobi sunbird (Cinnyris infrenatus) is a species of sunbird endemic to the central Indonesian Wakatobi islands. C. infrenatus has a higher pitched voice, darker plumage and shorter wings compared to the olive-backed sunbird (Cinnyris jugularis), to which it is closely related.

The speciation of the olive-backed and Wakatobi sunbirds follows Alfred Wallace's prediction about the Wallace Line, a separation of deep and shallow oceans of Asia and Australia that is difficult for most species to cross.

References 

infrenatus
Birds described in 1903